KAML-FM (97.3 MHz) is a radio station broadcasting a top 40 format, licensed to Gillette, Wyoming, United States. The station is currently owned by the Basin Radio Network, a division of Legend Communications of Wyoming, LLC, and features programming from AP Radio and Premiere Networks .

KAML-FM and its three sister stations, KIML, KGWY, and KDDV, are located at 2810 Southern Drive, Gillette. KAML-FM and KDDV share a transmitter site south of Gillette on a tower that is the tallest man-made structure in the state.

History
The station was assigned the call sign KOLL-FM on June 2, 1980. On December 26, 1988, the station changed its call sign to the current KAML.

References

External links

AML-FM
Radio stations established in 1980
Contemporary hit radio stations in the United States